La Tosca is a lost 1918 American drama silent film directed by Edward José and written by Charles E. Whittaker after the play La Tosca by Victorien Sardou. The film stars Pauline Frederick, Frank Losee, Jules Raucourt, Henry Hebert and W.H. Forestelle. The film was released on March 25, 1918, by Paramount Pictures.

Cast
Pauline Frederick as Floria Tosca
Frank Losee as Baron Scarpia
Jules Raucourt as Mario Cavaradossi
Henry Hebert as Cesare Angelotti
W.H. Forestelle as Spoletti

See also 
The Song of Hate (1915)

References

External links 

 
 

1918 films
1910s English-language films
Silent American drama films
1918 drama films
Paramount Pictures films
American films based on plays
Films based on La Tosca
Films directed by Edward José
Films set in the 1800s
Films set in Rome
American black-and-white films
Lost American films
American silent feature films
1918 lost films
Lost drama films
1910s American films